Ashbeer Saini (born 1994) is an Indian amateur golfer. He is the nephew of Baljit Singh Saini, who is an Olympian and Asian Games gold medalist for India in field hockey. Ashbeer Saini's father, Balwinder Singh Saini, who is also the elder brother of Baljeet Singh Saini has also represented India internationally in field hockey.

References

Indian male golfers
People from Kapurthala
Sportspeople from Punjab, India
1994 births
Living people
Date of birth missing (living people)